Casper Platt (June 6, 1892 – September 16, 1965) was a United States district judge of the United States District Court for the Eastern District of Illinois.

Education and career

Born in Danville, Illinois, Platt received a Bachelor of Arts degree from the University of Illinois at Urbana–Champaign in 1914 and a Juris Doctor from the University of Chicago Law School in 1916. He was in private practice in Danville from 1916 to 1917, and was in the United States Army during World War I from 1917 to 1918. After the war, he returned to private practice in Danville until 1933, also working as a city attorney for Danville from 1927 to 1928. He was a Judge of the Fifth Circuit Court of Illinois from 1933 to 1949.

Federal judicial service

On September 15, 1949, Platt was nominated by President Harry S. Truman to a seat on the United States District Court for the Eastern District of Illinois vacated by Judge Walter C. Lindley. Platt was confirmed by the United States Senate on October 12, 1949, and received his commission on October 13, 1949. He served as Chief Judge from 1956 until his death on September 16, 1965.

See also
List of Jewish American jurists

References

Sources
 

1892 births
1965 deaths
University of Illinois Urbana-Champaign alumni
University of Chicago Law School alumni
Illinois state court judges
Judges of the United States District Court for the Eastern District of Illinois
United States district court judges appointed by Harry S. Truman
20th-century American judges
United States Army soldiers
United States Army personnel of World War I
People from Danville, Illinois